The Born and Raised World Tour was the sixth headlining concert tour by American singer John Mayer in support of his fifth and sixth studio albums, Born and Raised (2012) and Paradise Valley (2013). On March 22, 2013, the tour was first announced and tickets went on sale March 29 and 30, 2013. The tour began on July 6, 2013 in Milwaukee and ended in June 2014. This was Mayer's first tour in three years and after undergoing his vocal surgery.

Opening acts
Phillip Phillips
Needtobreathe (Bonner Springs)
Andreas Moe (London, 9 June 2014)

Set list
(John played 78 different songs on the tour, only songs played at at least 1/3 of the 96 shows are listed here and are not in any particular order.)

"Queen of California" 
"Paper Doll"
"I Don't Trust Myself (With Loving You)"
"Something Like Olivia"
"Wildfire"
"Who Says"
"Going Down the Road Feeling Bad" 
"Vultures"
"Speak for Me"
"Waiting on the Day"
"Slow Dancing in a Burning Room"
"Your Body is a Wonderland"
"Half of My Heart"
"Born and Raised"
"Dear Marie"
"If I Ever Get Around to Living"
"Age of Worry"
"Gravity"
"Waiting on the World to Change"
"A Face to Call Home"

Tour dates

Miscellaneous

Box office score data
Sold out shows: 7/16/13, 7/17/13, 9/16/13, 9/17/13, 10/3/13, 10/15/13, 10/16/13, 10/17/13, 10/22/13, 10/24/13 and 10/14/1310/17/13, 10/20/13, 10/22/13, 10/23/13, 10/24/13.

Band
 Sean Hurley: bass, backing vocals
 Andy Burton: keyboards
 Aaron Sterling: drums
 Zane Carney: rhythm guitar
 Carlos Ricketts: backing vocals
 Tiffany Palmer: backing vocals
 Doug Pettibone: guitar, pedal steel guitar

Critical reception
Piet Levy of the Milwaukee Journal Sentinel said, "Mayer sounded sublime Saturday, as though his soulful voice had been dipped in honey, from the opening vocals of the rustic Raised track 'Queen of California'." Dan Hyman from Rolling Stone said, "Mayer's voice was the elephant in the room all evening. The singer has taken many songs down into a noticeable lower vocal register – a change-up most noticeable on 'Waiting on the World to Change', during which he forwent all of his falsetto parts. But on the whole singer's voice sounded strong and confident."

External links
Mayer's official website

References

2013 concert tours
2014 concert tours
John Mayer concert tours